The 2005 ARCA Re/Max Series was the 53rd season of the ARCA Racing Series, a division of the Automobile Racing Club of America (ARCA). The season was scheduled to begin on February 7, 2005, with the Advance Discount Auto Parts 200 at Daytona International Speedway, and ended with the Food World 300 at Talladega Superspeedway eight months later. Frank Kimmel won driver's championship, his seventh in the series, while Joey Miller won the Rookie of the Year award.

Schedule
The 2005 ARCA Re/MAX Series schedule consisted of twenty-three races, at seventeen tracks in twelve states. Fourteen events on the schedule were televised live by SPEED Channel.

Results and standings

Races

Drivers' championship
(key) Bold – Pole position awarded by time. Italics – Pole position set by final practice results or rainout. * – Most laps led.
{|
| valign="top" |

See also
 2005 NASCAR Nextel Cup Series
 2005 NASCAR Busch Series
 2005 NASCAR Craftsman Truck Series

References

ARCA Menards Series seasons
Arca Remax Series, 2005 In